The 1975 Japan Series was the 26th edition of Nippon Professional Baseball's postseason championship series. It matched the Central League champion Hiroshima Toyo Carp against the Pacific League champion Hankyu Braves. The Braves defeated the Carp in six games, four games to zero, with Games 1 and 4 finishing tied. This was the Braves' first championship in team history.

Summary

See also
1975 World Series

References

Japan Series
Hiroshima Toyo Carp
Orix Buffaloes
Japan Series
Japan Series
Japan Series
Japan Series